Peg Munky Run is a stream in the U.S. state of South Dakota.

Peg Munky Run is a corruption of its original name "Pee Munky Run".

See also
List of rivers of South Dakota

References

Rivers of Brookings County, South Dakota
Rivers of Deuel County, South Dakota
Rivers of South Dakota